Georgi Ivanovich Zharkov (born 19 August 1915 in Bogorodsk; died 19 October 1981 in Moscow) was a Soviet Russian football player and coach.

Honours
 Soviet Top League bronze: 1945.
 Soviet Cup winner: 1949.
 Soviet Cup finalist: 1947.

External links
 

1918 births
People from Noginsk
1981 deaths
Soviet footballers
Soviet Top League players
FC Torpedo Moscow players
Soviet football managers
FC Zenit Saint Petersburg managers
FC Torpedo Moscow managers
FC Ararat Yerevan managers
FC Ural Yekaterinburg managers
Neftçi PFK managers
Association football forwards
FC Iskra Smolensk players
PFC CSKA Moscow players
Sportspeople from Moscow Oblast